Colossus-class battleship may refer to:
 Colossus-class battleship (1882)
 Colossus-class battleship (1910)